Nizhniye Kigi (Tübänge Qıyğı) is a rural locality (a selo) and the administrative centre of Nizhnekiginsky Selsoviet, Kiginsky District, Bashkortostan, Russia. The population was 1,380 as of 2010. There are 20 streets.

Geography 
Nizhniye Kigi is located 20 km north of Verkhniye Kigi (the district's administrative centre) by road. Urak is the nearest rural locality.

References 

Rural localities in Kiginsky District
Ufa Governorate